Intamin Amusement Rides is a design and manufacturing company in Schaan, Liechtenstein. It is best known for creating thrill rides and roller coasters worldwide. The Intamin brand name is a syllabic abbreviation for "international amusement installations". The company has offices throughout the world, including three in Europe, three in Asia, and two in the United States.

Intamin supplies numerous styles of roller coasters, vertical rides, water rides, immersive rides, swing rides, and observation attractions to amusement parks. The company has installed scores of roller coasters in several countries. Intamin designed and built the first river rapids ride, known as Thunder River, and marketed the first freefall ride (developed by Giovanola) and drop tower.

Products and technologies
Intamin's product range spans two broad categories: rides and transportation.

Amusement rides

Roller coasters

Kingda Ka at Six Flags Great Adventure, for instance, is North America's tallest and fastest coaster, launching riders from 0– in 3.5 seconds.

Intamin is also known for its massive Mega and Giga Coasters, Intamin's terms for a hypercoaster. Intamin Giga and Mega Coasters currently occupy three of the top five Golden Ticket Awards with perennial favorites Millennium Force, Superman the Ride and Expedition GeForce.

Intamin uses computerized and industrialized engineering and manufacturing methods for its wooden coasters, rather than traditional on-site fabrication.  Coasters such as Colossos at Heide Park, Balder at Liseberg and El Toro at Six Flags Great Adventure utilized this manufacturing technique. Unlike other traditional wood coasters, these rides use prefabricated track sections made of a high-strength wooden laminate that can be secured on-site when the superstructure is completed. This design enables the coaster to reach speeds and navigate course elements smoothly, like a steel roller coaster, while retaining the look and some of the traditional feel of common wooden coasters.

Another development by Intamin is the ZacSpin, a type of 4th Dimension roller coaster first seen in 2007. Kirnu at Linnanmäki in Finland was the first ZacSpin in the world and opened on April 27, 2007. It has individual cars, each with 8 seats, arranged in two pods coming off the sides of the car, each with 2 seats facing forward and two facing backward. This car is either lifted to the highest point by a conventional chain lift, or propelled around the course at a constant speed by a Linear Motor system.

The company is known for being the original home to Bolliger & Mabillard (B&M). The two engineers worked for Giovanola who in turn were frequently contracted by Intamin for their early stand-up roller coasters (Giovanola eventually started producing roller coasters independently). B&M broke away from Giovanola to form their own company which now supplies roller coasters as well. Similarities between the two companies are often obvious, such as the style of track used by B&M, which was used in a number of early Giovanola installations which were contracted by Intamin.

Ferris wheels

Intamin brokered a number of rides that were manufactured by Waagner-Biro. These included a series of rides for Marriott Corporation, each comprising a vertical column supporting multiple horizontal arms, with each arm supporting a Ferris wheel. The first was Giant Wheel which operated at Hersheypark in Hershey, Pennsylvania from 1973 until 2004. Similar Intamin supplied Waagner-Biro wheels included Zodiac (Kings Island, Mason, Ohio) and Scorpion (Parque de la Ciudad, Buenos Aires, Argentina). All are now defunct.

Sky Whirl, the world's first triple Ferris wheel, which debuted at both Marriott's Great America parks (now Six Flags Great America, Gurnee, Illinois, and California's Great America, Santa Clara) in 1976, was also manufactured by Waagner-Biro and brokered by Intamin. The Santa Clara ride, renamed Triple Wheel in post-Marriott years, closed on 1 September 1997. The Gurnee ride closed in 2000.

The Orlando Eye, which opened in April 2015, was designed and built by Intamin.

Transportation
Outside the amusement realm, Intamin supplies monorail transportation systems which are used in both public transport networks and at tourist attractions across the world. Planning of the monorail started in 1998. It has six stations.

In 2016 two monorails using Intamin equipment were opened, the  Ashgabat Monorail in Turkmenistan   and a  monorail in the Cross River State, Nigeria  which connects the Calabar International Convention Centre to the Tinapa Resort.

In 2020 the Marconi Express Monorail opened successfully as a shuttle between the Bologna Guglielmo Marconi Airport and the Bologna Centrale railway station.

Intamin has also constructed monorails at amusement parks Xi'an and Ningbo in China and the Asia Park Monorail in Da Nang in Vietnam.

Notable Intamin rides

Safety incidents

Intamin has been in the news for a number of safety-related incidents.
 In 1984, three passengers riding The Edge at Six Flags Great America were injured and briefly hospitalized. The ride experienced a malfunction that caused it to fall backward down the wrong shaft.
 On June 9, 1991, 32-year-old Candy Taylor of Toledo, Ohio, fell to her death from Flight Commander, an Intamin Flight Trainer, located at Kings Island. Investigators determined that a design flaw in the seat divider could allow a rider to slide into an unoccupied seat and become free from the restraint. A coroner's report later revealed that the victim had a blood-alcohol level of 0.30 which may have also contributed. Speculation suggests the rider lost consciousness during the ride and slid out from the restraints.
 On May 16, 1999, a  guest was unable to close his lap bar on Ride of Steel at Six Flags Darien Lake. As a result, he was ejected, fell approximately 9 feet as the ride went over a camel hump hill, and suffered serious injuries. He sued the park and the ride manufacturer for negligence and was awarded US$3.95 million.
 In August 1999, a 12-year-old mentally disabled boy fell from the 207-foot (63 m) high Drop Tower: Scream Zone, at California's Great America, and died. The victim's family claimed his harness was not locked properly. An investigation was inconclusive and no charges were filed.
 In September 2001, a 40-year-old woman fell from Perilous Plunge (Knott's Berry Farm) into the water, was hit by the boat, and died. An investigation showed that the  woman had loosened the safety restraints, so she could fit more comfortably into the ride.
 On April 16, 2004, a 16-year-old girl from Pontypool was killed after falling approximately 30 m (100 ft) into shallow water from the top of Hydro (now called Drenched) at Oakwood Leisure Park, Narberth, Pembrokeshire, United Kingdom. During a lawsuit brought by the victim's family against Oakwood, a jury returned a narrative verdict stating that the victim had fallen out due to being improperly restrained.
 The second incident of 2004 was on one of Intamin's mega coasters, Superman: Ride of Steel, at Six Flags New England in Massachusetts. The ride, again with lap bar restraints, was dispatched with a rider who had cerebral palsy in the front seat; this passenger subsequently died after being ejected from his seat. According to an investigation, the ride operators were primarily to blame, for not ensuring the rider was properly secured. Intamin was also partially blamed, as the ride's safety system allowed the train to be dispatched without all of the restraints properly secured.
 The third incident of 2004 happened on July 14 and involved one of Intamin's launched stratacoasters. Four people were injured while riding on Cedar Point's Top Thrill Dragster. The majority of guests waiting in the queue line would be standing no more than 10 to 15 feet from the track, at closest range. They were treated at the park's first aid station. Two were further treated at Firelands Regional Medical Center.
 In June 2007, a 13-year-old girl lost both feet at the ankles on Superman: Tower of Power, at Six Flags Kentucky Kingdom, when a ride malfunction caused a cable to snap. She was brought to the hospital in critical condition, but miraculously  survived, with doctors being able to re-attach her right foot. The park was later fined $1,000 for not properly maintaining the ride; An undisclosed settlement was later reached with Six Flags, which will provide for her for the remainder of her life.
 On September 16, 2009, two guests were injured when a cable snapped on Xcelerator at Knott's Berry Farm. This ride is a similar, though smaller version of Top Thrill Dragster at Cedar Point in Ohio, or Kingda Ka at Six Flags Great Adventure in New Jersey. The train launches riders from 0 to 80 miles per hour in a matter of seconds, ascends a vertical top-hat, and descends down the other side. The 12-year-old victim had lacerations on his leg, while the adult victim complained of back injuries.
 On April 29, 2010, a ride train on Expedition GeForce partially derailed from the track, fully occupied with passengers. Riders were stranded 20m in the air, with eight of them complaining of nausea and bruising.
 On July 8, 2011, a 29-year-old guest was killed when he was ejected from  Superman: Ride of Steel. The rider, an Iraq War veteran whose legs had been amputated, was on the front row of the roller coaster when he was thrown from the train during the course of the ride. Park officials stated that the ride was in proper mechanical order and that the various safety restraints were also working normally at the time of the incident, but that the attraction would remain closed pending an investigation. It was determined that ride operators at the time should not have permitted the man to get on the ride, due to his status as a double amputee.
 On February 24, 2012, a 14-year-old girl died in an accident at Hopi Hari, Vinhedo, São Paulo State, Brazil. She fell from the La Tour Eiffel drop tower ride, suffered cranial trauma, and died on the way to hospital. Initial investigations suggested the possibility of mechanical failure in a restraint latch.
 On July 24, 2012, the launch cable of the accelerator coaster Rita at Alton Towers, Staffordshire, UK, snapped during a morning test run. There were no passengers aboard at the time and no injuries occurred.
 On July 19, 2013, a boat on the Shoot the Rapids log flume (at Cedar Point) rolled back down the ride's lift hill and flipped over, injuring seven, and was said to leave them stranded under water for a few minutes before guests and park employees could get them out. Six were cleared by park medical staff, and one was examined at a local hospital before being released. The ride closed during the investigation. Cedar Point reopened the ride in May 2014.
 On July 7, 2014, a teenager was killed after his harness sprung open on Inferno, a ZacSpin fourth-dimension roller coaster at Terra Mítica in Benidorm, Spain.
 On May 9, 2017, an 11-year-old girl Evha Jannath died from her injuries after she fell from the Splash Canyon ride and into the water at Drayton Manor Theme Park in England. The water ride has remained closed for the foreseeable future, following the HSE safety examination.
On July 3, 2021, an 11-year-old boy died and five others were injured on the Raging River at Adventureland Park in Altoona, Iowa. The raft was carrying six riders, all of whom suffered injuries with two, including the boy, suffering critical injuries.

On August 15, 2021, a female guest was injured at Cedar Point when an unknown metal object dislodged from Top Thrill Dragster and struck her in the head.

References

External links

 

 
Amusement ride manufacturers
Roller coaster manufacturers
Manufacturing companies of Liechtenstein